McGregor is an unincorporated community in Redbank Township, Armstrong County, Pennsylvania, United States. The community lies along PA-839 at the junction with Porter Rd.

History
A post office called McGregor was established in 1904 and remained in operation until 1905.

References 

Unincorporated communities in Armstrong County, Pennsylvania
Unincorporated communities in Pennsylvania